Port of Miami 2 is the tenth studio album by American rapper Rick Ross. It was released on August 9, 2019, by Maybach Music Group and Epic Records. The album features guest appearances from Wale, Gunplay, Summer Walker, Dej Loaf, Swizz Beatz, Meek Mill, Nipsey Hussle, Teyana Taylor, Jeezy, YFN Lucci, Ball Greezy, A Boogie wit da Hoodie, Denzel Curry, John Legend, Lil Wayne, and Drake. Port of Miami 2 serves as the sequel to Ross' debut album, Port of Miami, released in 2006. It was supported by three singles: "Act a Fool", "Big Tyme", and "Gold Roses".

Background
On July 16, 2019, the album's release date was announced. On July 31, Rick Ross was featured in an interview on Big Boy's Neighborhood radio show in which he said:  Ross shared the album's tracklist on August 1, 2019.

Artwork
The artwork, an homage to the original Port of Miami cover depicts Ross holding a pendant with a picture of Black Bo, his friend and manager, who died in December 2017.

Promotion
The album's lead single, "Act a Fool" featuring Wale, was released on June 21, 2019, the song peaked at number 45 on the Hot R&B/Hip-Hop Songs.

The second single, "Big Tyme" featuring Swizz Beatz, was released on July 2, 2019, the music video for the song was released on July 30.

The third single, "Gold Roses" featuring Drake, was released on July 26, 2019, the song peaked at number 39 on the Billboard Hot 100.

Promotional singles
"Turnpike Ike" was released as a promotional single on August 6, 2019.

Critical reception

Port of Miami 2 was met with generally positive reviews. At Metacritic, which assigns a normalized rating out of 100 to reviews from professional publications, the album received an average score of 67, based on seven reviews.

Aaron Bishop of Clash wrote that Port of Miami 2 "shows Renzel with his pen at his sharpest, his beats at their grandest and his coveted guest verse spots at their most impactful. Over a decade at the top of the rap mountain has seen the MMG icon have his ups and downs. But on what is his tenth studio album, he proves why he’s achieved such longevity in the fickle game that is rap. Tracks such as "Turnpike Ike" showcase the four-time Grammy nominee at his very best, while his willingness to delve into topics outside of his luxurious lifestyle add a depth and gravitas to the record that make it a worthy successor to the original thirteen years on." Andy Kellman of AllMusic saying "Frequent serious references to mortality make Port of Miami 2 his heaviest recording." Evan Rytlewski of Pitchfork stated: "Too often on Port of Miami 2, he locks into the flow of least resistance and simply lets it ride, hiding behind his production instead of asserting his dominion over it. And while his music remains sumptuous as always, that luster alone is no longer enough to wow."

In a mixed review, Rolling Stones Christopher R. Weingarten stated: "Most of his 10th album, Port of Miami 2, is Ross exactly as you know and love him: the obscene boasts, the window-cracking bass, the speedboat cool, the various spins on raps-to-riches success." Will Lavin of NME said, "While the beginning of the album struggles, you'll be hard pushed to find a five-song stretch as flawless as the close out tracks on Ross' 10th studio album." Jesse Fairfax of Spin wrote that "Port of Miami 2 further cements Ross as a mainstay among the aging elite—those rappers whose names now carry them further than their music does. Playing it safe with the sequel to his far more ambitious debut LP, Ross regurgitates that which people have come to love from him, or at least have accepted as his standard."

Commercial performance
Port of Miami 2 debuted at number two on the US Billboard 200, behind Slipknot's sixth album We Are Not Your Kind, with 80,000 album-equivalent units, of which 25,000 were pure album sales. It is Ross's 10th US top 10 album.

Track listing

Notes
 "Big Tyme" features background vocals by Ken Lewis
 "Bogus Charms" features vocals by Sam Harvey and November Ultra
 "Rich Nigga Lifestyle" features vocals by Will Gittens
 "Fascinated" features vocals by Bishop
 "Vegas Residency" features vocals by Teedra Moses

Sample credits
 "Turnpike Ike" contains a sample from "Help (Someone Please)", written by Eddie Levert and Robert Dukes, and performed by The O'Jays.
 "Summer Reign" contains a sample from "Rain", written by Brian Alexander Morgan and Jaco Pastorius, and performed by SWV.
 "Rich Nigga Freestyle" contains a sample from "Does Your Mama Know", written by Will Gittens, Thomas Bennett, Mic Lovay, Robert Curington, and Rudy Love, and performed by Rudy Love & The Love Family.
 "Fascinated" contains a sample from "Ain't No Sunshine", written by Bill Withers, and performed by Lyn Collins.
 "I Still Pray" contains a sample from "Let's Fall in Love (Parts 1 & 2)", written by Ernest Isley, Marvin Isley, Kelly O'Isley, Ronald Isley, Rudolph Isley, and Christopher Jasper, and performed by The Isley Brothers.
 "Vegas Residency" contains a sample from "Faust", written and performed by Paul Williams.
 "Gold Roses" contains a sample from "Israël Suite", written by Sylvian Krief and Boris Bergman, and performed by Rupture.

Personnel
Credits adapted from Tidal.

Instrumentation
 Ken Lewis – guitar, horn, strings (track 6)
 Brent Kolatalo – bass, drums, keyboards (track 6)
 Maxime Breton – guitar (track 7)
 Joshua "Principal Muzik" Everett – piano (track 13 14)
 Alex Page – strings (tracks 13, 14)
 Tyler Cates – guitar (tracks 13, 14)
 Joshua Vincent – horn (track 14)
 Jonah Vincent – horn (track 14)
 J Troy Bass – bass (track 14)
 Gumbi Ortiz – percussion (track 14)

Technical
 David Anthony "Trop" Bermudez – recording (tracks 1, 3–6, 9, 10, 14, 15)
 Thomas "Tomcat" Bennett – recording (tracks 2, 7, 8, 11, 12)
 Fabian Marasciullo – mixing (tracks 1–5, 8–12, 15)
 Thomas McLaren – mixing (track 3), engineering assistant (tracks 1, 2, 4, 5, 8–12, 15)
 Just Blaze – mixing (track 6)
 Finis "KY" White – mixing (track 7)
 Leslie Brathwaite – mixing (tracks 13, 14)
 Colin Leonard – mastering (tracks 1–8, 10–15)
 Ian Kimmel – engineering (track 6)

Charts

Weekly charts

Year-end charts

References

2019 albums
Rick Ross albums
Epic Records albums
Maybach Music Group albums
Sequel albums
Albums produced by DJ Toomp
Albums produced by J.U.S.T.I.C.E. League
Albums produced by Jake One
Albums produced by Just Blaze
Albums produced by Vinylz